Eike Duckwitz (born 29 May 1980) is a German former field hockey player who played as a defender for the German national team.

He is an Olympic medalist who competed in the 2004 Summer Olympics. He also competed in the 2006 World Cup, two European championships and four Champions Trophies.

References

External links
 

1980 births
Living people
Field hockey players from Hamburg
German male field hockey players
Male field hockey defenders
Olympic field hockey players of Germany
Field hockey players at the 2004 Summer Olympics
2006 Men's Hockey World Cup players
Olympic bronze medalists for Germany
Olympic medalists in field hockey
Medalists at the 2004 Summer Olympics
Uhlenhorster HC players
21st-century German people